Elimane Coulibaly (born 15 March 1980 in Dakar) is a Senegalese retired professional footballer who played as a forward.

Club career

First years
Having emigrated from Senegal to Belgium, Coulibaly first started playing football in the local teams of KFC Oostakker and KVK Ninove. At the start of the 2005–06 season, Coulibaly left KVK Ninove for KMSK Deinze, which played in the Second Division, where he scored 15 times in 36 games over two seasons.

KV Kortrijk
At the end of the 2005-06 season, Coulibaly joined the West-Flemish fellow Second Division team KV Kortrijk on a two-year-contract. In his first season, he managed five goals in 27 games while his club was promoted to the Belgian Pro League. The season 2008–2009 became the breakthrough of Coulibaly: thanks to his 11 goals, Kortrijk managed to avoid relegation from the Pro League.

AA Gent
In summer 2009, Coulibaly signed a three-year contract with AA Gent. Following a slow start to the 2009–2010 season with few appearances he got his first goal versus Mechelen before going on to score 11 goals for the season and thus greatly contributing to AA Gent's vice-championship. Coulibaly also scored the first goal in the cup final as his club beat Cercle Brugge to win the 2009–10 Belgian Cup.

Coulibaly's second season in Ghent was less spectacular than his first. He scored AA Gent's first ever goal in Champions League qualification as his team lost 6–1 on aggregate to Dynamo Kyiv in the third qualifying round for the 2010–2011 Champions League and helped AA Gent make the group phase of the Europa League by scoring in their return leg against Feyenoord in the playoff round, but later lost his place in the starting lineup to new arrival Shlomi Arbeitman.

Beerschot AC
Having been released by Gent Coulibaly joined Beerschot AC in July 2012. However, on 24 October 2012, he was released by the club for aggressive behavior towards his teammate Hernán Losada. Coulibaly clashed with Losada after their team's 3-0 defeat by KRC Genk on 20 October 2012.

Return to AA Gent
Free agent Coulibaly was signed by Gent in December 2012.

Honours 
 K.A.A. Gent
 Belgian Cup (1): 2009–10

References

External links
 Guardian's Stats Centre
 

1980 births
Living people
Footballers from Dakar
Senegalese footballers
Senegalese expatriate footballers
Belgian footballers
Belgian Pro League players
Challenger Pro League players
K.V. Kortrijk players
K.A.A. Gent players
Beerschot A.C. players
K.M.S.K. Deinze players
K.V. Oostende players
Royal Excel Mouscron players
Association football forwards
Expatriate footballers in Belgium
Senegalese expatriate sportspeople in Belgium
K.V.K. Ninove players